Standard Air Lines Flight 897R was a domestic passenger flight between Albuquerque, New Mexico and Burbank, California. At 7:43am on July 12, 1949, the flight, operated by a Curtiss C-46E (registered ), crashed in Chatsworth, California, upon approach to Burbank, killing 35 of the 48 passengers and crew on board.

The flight
The Standard Air Lines flight departed from Albuquerque Municipal Airport at 4:24am for a flight to the Hollywood-Lockheed Air Terminal (today called Burbank Airport). At 7:36am the aircraft was cleared to land at Burbank. After that, there was no other communication from the flight.

Crash 
The aircraft was flying in level flight with the gear down, on an ILS approach to Hollywood-Lockheed Air Terminal (today called Burbank Airport) on a Tuesday morning. The aircraft descended in patchy fog below the minimum altitude permitted and its right wing tip struck the side of a hill at 1,890 feet above sea level, pulling the plane around 90 degrees. The C-46 hit the ground and bounced 300 feet into the air before crashing in Chatsworth, CA, some 430 feet below the crest of Santa Susana Pass, just north of the Chatsworth Reservoir. 

It was originally reported that a fist fight had broken out between two male passengers, however survivors later stated that the fight was not the cause of the crash but instead it was based on pilot error. The CAB report stated, "This accident was caused solely by the pilot voluntarily going below the prescribed minimum altitude and descending into the overcast...".

Survivors
Actress Caren Marsh Doll was among the survivors of the crash. She recalled "I heard screams and a fire crackling....Then I remember a woman grabbed my arm. She was wonderful. I heard her say 'Let's get out of here'. She dragged me out of the plane and into the brush."

Aftermath
Due to regulation violations, Standard Air Lines was ordered to cease non-scheduled operations, and it merged with Viking Air Lines to form North American Airlines shortly afterwards.

See also
Controlled flight into terrain

References

External links
Report from the Civil Aeronautics Board (PDF)
http://planecrashinfo.com/1949/1949-32.htm
Night photo of aircraft
Photo of aircraft
Photo of crash from L.A. Times archive
Image of men searching the wreckage of Standard Airlines C-46 for clues regarding the cause of the crash, 1949. Los Angeles Times Photographic Archive (Collection 1429). UCLA Library Special Collections, Charles E. Young Research Library, University of California, Los Angeles. 

Airliner accidents and incidents in California
Airliner accidents and incidents caused by pilot error
Aviation accidents and incidents in the United States in 1949
Disasters in California
Chatsworth, Los Angeles
1949 in California
Accidents and incidents involving the Curtiss-Wright C-46 Commando
July 1949 events in the United States
Airliner accidents and incidents involving controlled flight into terrain